1830 Pogson, provisional designation , is a stony Florian asteroid and an asynchronous binary system from the inner regions of the asteroid belt, approximately  in diameter. It was discovered on 17 April 1968, by Swiss astronomer Paul Wild at the Zimmerwald Observatory near Bern, Switzerland. The S-type asteroid has a rotation period 2.6 of hours. It was named for English astronomer Norman Pogson. The discovery of its 2.5-kilometer sized companion was announced in May 2007.

Orbit and classification 

According to a HCM-analysis by David Nesvorný, Pogson is a member of the Flora family, a giant asteroid clan and the largest family of stony asteroids in the asteroid belt. It has also been grouped into the Augusta family by Zappalà, while for Milani and Knežević, who don't recognize the Florian clan as a family, Pogson is a non-family asteroid from the main belt's background population.

It orbits the Sun in the inner asteroid belt at a distance of 2.1–2.3 AU once every 3 years and 3 months (1,182 days; semi-major axis of 2.19 AU). Its orbit has an eccentricity of 0.06 and an inclination of 4° with respect to the ecliptic.

Naming 

This minor planet was named after English astronomer Norman Pogson (1829–1891), inventor of the modern astronomical magnitude scale. At the Radcliffe and Madras observatories, he discovered eight asteroids, including 42 Isis and 67 Asia. The official  was published by the Minor Planet Center on 15 October 1977. The lunar crater Pogson was also named in his honor.

Physical characteristics 

In the Tholen and SMASS classification, Pogson is a common, stony S-type asteroid.

Rotation period 

In April 2007, a rotational lightcurve of Pogson was obtained from photometric observations by an international collaboration of Australian, European and American astronomers, namely, David Higgins	, Petr Pravec, Peter Kušnirák, Julian Oey and Donald Pray. Lightcurve analysis gave a rotation period of  hours with a brightness variation of 0.12 magnitude. In the following month, a more refined period of  hours with the same amplitude was measured by Petr Pravec.

Additional period determinations were made by Melissa Dykhuis and collaborators (2.5698 h) at the Calvin College Observatory  during 2008, and by Pierre Antonini (2.5699 h) and Julian Oey (2.604 h) in March 2013.

Satellite 

During the photometric observation in 2007, it was also revealed, that Pogson is an asynchronous binary system with a minor-planet moon in its orbit. The mutual eclipse and occultation events showed that the companion, provisionally designated , orbits its primary every 24.24 hours. Based on a secondary-to-primary diameter ratio of 0.32 or larger, Johnston's archive estimates a diameter of 2.52 kilometers for the satellite, separated by 8 kilometers from its primary.

Diameter and albedo 

According to the survey carried out by the NEOWISE mission of NASA's Wide-field Infrared Survey Explorer, Pogson measures between 7.7 and 8.35 kilometers in diameter and its surface has an albedo between 0.2188 and 0.274. The Collaborative Asteroid Lightcurve Link adopts the result from Petr Pravec's revised WISE-data, that is, an albedo of 0.2188 and a diameter of 8.35 kilometers based on an absolute magnitude of 12.659.

References

External links 
 Asteroids with Satellites, Robert Johnston, johnstonsarchive.net
 Asteroid Lightcurve Database (LCDB), query form (info )
 Dictionary of Minor Planet Names, Google books
 Asteroids and comets rotation curves, CdR – Observatoire de Genève, Raoul Behrend
 Discovery Circumstances: Numbered Minor Planets (1)-(5000) – Minor Planet Center
 
 

001830
Discoveries by Paul Wild (Swiss astronomer)
Named minor planets
001830
001830
001830
19680417